Haines may refer to:

Haines (surname), includes partial list of people with the surname
 Haines (character), a character in James Joyce's Ulysses

Places

Antarctica
 Haines Glacier, Antarctica
 Haines Mountains, mountain range in Antarctica

Australia
Haines, South Australia, a locality on Kangaroo Island
Hundred of Haines, a cadastral unit in South Australia

Canada
 Haines Junction, Yukon, town in Yukon Territory, Canada
Haines Junction Airport

United States
 Haines, Alaska, city in Haines Borough, Alaska, USA
Haines Airport, an airport in Haines, Alaska, USA
Haines Seaplane Base, a seaplane base in Haines, Alaska, USA
 Haines Borough, Alaska, USAHaines, California

 Haines, Oregon, town in Baker County, Oregon, USA
 Haines City, Florida, city in Polk County, Florida, USA
 Haines Mission, an alternative name for Fort William H. Seward, Alaska, USA
 Haines Falls, New York, USA, town in Greene County, New York, USA
 Haines Township, Pennsylvania, town in Centre County, Pennsylvania, USA

Other
 26879 Haines, asteroid
 Haines & Bonner, British shirt manufacturer established 1865
 Haines Index, a weather index devised by Donald Haines in 1988
 Haines Falls, New York, hamlet in  Westchester County, New York, United States 
 Haines Highway, highway between Alaska, USA, and British Columbia, Canada
 HAINES, a recovery position used in first aid to maintain an open airway for victims with known or possible spinal injuries
 , US Navy ship launched in 1943

See also

 includes people with surname Haines
Haine (disambiguation)
Hanes

Haynes (disambiguation)
Haimes (surname)